Stad or Stadlandet is a peninsula in Stad Municipality in the northwestern part of the Nordfjord district in Vestland county in Norway.  The peninsula is considered the dividing point between the Norwegian Sea to the north and the North Sea to the south.  The name is sometimes also written as Stadt, Statt, or Statlandet (not to be confused with the similar German word Stadt), because the Norwegian pronunciation of the d in this case is as a t. The name could be translated as "the land of places" or "the land of towns". Some of the larger villages on the peninsula include Ervik (northwestern tip), Borgundvåg and Leikanger (northeastern side), and the village of Selje (southwestern side).

Geography
The peninsula is a  mountain plateau topped by the  Tarvaldsegga peak. There are several lower valleys on the peninsula, but at the western end, the plateau plunges into the sea in a  cliff at Kjerringa.

Stad Peninsula has a very harsh, windy climate. The highest wind speed in the country is often recorded at this promontory. Located between the cities of Bergen (to the south) and Ålesund (in Møre og Romsdal county to the north), this is the only peninsula of mainland between Stavanger and Honningsvåg that goes out into open sea without any archipelago that breaks waves. Most of the rest of the ship route from Bergen to Ålesund is protected by islands.

Because of the harsh climate, the peninsula can be an obstacle for ship transport along the coast of Norway. Current transportation from Bergen-Ålesund is by air via Oslo, by car (7–8 hours), by bus (9 hours) or by the Hurtigruten coastal ferry (13 hours).

As far back as the 1870s there were plans for the construction of a ship tunnel. A pilot project was developed in 1985, and the development company founded the same year. Plans are currently well underway to build the Stad Ship Tunnel at the narrowest point connecting the Moldefjorden to the Kjødspollen (the innermost part of the Vanylvsfjorden) with capacity to take large ships such as the Hurtigruten vessels.

Media gallery

See also
Norwegian trench

References

External links 
 Selje Municipality 
 Official travel guide for the Nordfjord region

Peninsulas of Vestland
Stad, Norway